Heaven on Earth is the second solo studio album by American singer Belinda Carlisle. It was released on October 5, 1987, by MCA Records. Three singles reached the top 10 of the US Billboard Hot 100, including the number-one single and Carlisle's signature song "Heaven Is a Place on Earth". The album has been certified triple Platinum in the United Kingdom and Platinum in many countries, including the United States.

Singles
The first single released, "Heaven Is a Place on Earth", reached the number one position throughout the world. The second song released was "I Get Weak", written by Diane Warren. "I Get Weak" reached the number two spot in the U.S. and garnered a top 10 placing in Canada and the U.K. The third single, "Circle in the Sand", reached the top 10 in many countries, among them U.K. (#4), U.S. (#7) and Canada (#5). From the fourth single on, the singles released from the album varied in different territories. The Cream cover "I Feel Free" was released only in the U.S., reaching #88 on the Billboard Hot 100. This was the final U.S. single from the album. In Europe, "World Without You" (another Diane Warren song) was released, where it reached the top 40. A fifth and final single in the U.K. was the ballad "Love Never Dies" which reached number #54.

Amongst the songs Carlisle recorded, but did not include on the album, are "Waiting for a Star to Fall" and "Some Hearts", which would become big hits for Boy Meets Girl and Carrie Underwood, respectively.

Reissues
In May 2009, Heaven on Earth was re-released as a remastered two disc special edition. This special edition includes several bonus remixes and a live DVD. The inclusion of the live DVD marked the first time the concert footage filmed in Philadelphia during the 1988 'Good Heavens' world tour was made available in DVD format. It had previously only been available on VHS.

Heaven On Earth was again re-released on August 26, 2013, in a 2CD+DVD casebook edition from Edsel Recording ( EDSG 80265 ) featuring the original album remastered, the single versions, remixes and B-sides. The DVD features the videos from the album and the concert footage filmed in Philadelphia during the 1988 'Good Heavens' world tour as well as an exclusive interview with Carlisle, discussing the album.

Fellow Go-Go Charlotte Caffey's group The Graces covered "Should I Let You In?" for their 1989 album Perfect View.

Critical reception

AllMusic's Alex Henderson gave the album four stars out of five, saying "while nothing here packs quite the punch that 'How Much More,' 'We Got the Beat,' and 'Turn to You' did, such memorable songs as 'Heaven Is a Place on Earth,' 'Should I Let You In?', and 'I Get Weak' show that the Angeleno still had plenty of spirit".

Track listing

Personnel
Credits adapted from the liner notes of Heaven on Earth.

Musicians

 Belinda Carlisle – lead vocals, backing vocals, air guitar
 Charles Judge – keyboards, drum programming, acoustic piano
 John McCurry – electric guitars
 Kenny Aronoff – drums
 John Pierce – bass
 Rhett Lawrence – Fairlight
 Rick Nowels – keyboards, drum programming, acoustic guitars, electric guitars, backing vocals, arrangements
 Dann Huff – electric guitars
 Curly Smith – drums
 Thomas Dolby – additional keyboards
 Mike Landau – additional guitars
 Jimmy Bralower – additional percussion
 Paulinho da Costa – additional percussion
 Tim Pierce – additional guitar
 George Black – additional guitar
 David Kemper – additional percussion
 Beth Anderson – backing vocals
 Charlotte Caffey – backing vocals
 Donna Davidson – backing vocals
 Donna De Lory – backing vocals
 Edie Lehmann – backing vocals
 Michelle Phillips – backing vocals
 Chynna Phillips – backing vocals
 Ellen Shipley – backing vocals

Technical

 Rick Nowels – production
 Steve MacMillan – recording ; mixing 
 Robert Feist – additional engineering
 Stacy Baird – additional engineering
 Shelly Yakus – mixing 
 Charles Judge – mixing assistance
 Matthew Freeman – engineering assistance, production assistance
 Joe Schiff – engineering assistance
 Clark Germaine – engineering assistance
 Brian Scheuble – engineering assistance
 Ethan Jones – engineering assistance
 Bob Vogt – engineering assistance
 Rob Jacobs – engineering assistance
 Marc DeSisto – engineering assistance
 Stephen Marcussen – mastering at Precision Lacquer (Hollywood, California)
 Ellen Shipley – additional vocal production
 Robert Feist – additional vocal production
 Timothy McDaniel – production coordination
 Nancy Del Los Santos – production assistance

Artwork
 Phillip Dixon – photography
 Norman Moore – art direction, design

Charts

Weekly charts

Year-end chart

Certifications

Notes

References

1987 albums
Albums produced by Rick Nowels
Belinda Carlisle albums
MCA Records albums
Virgin Records albums